The Canton of Sancoins is a former canton situated in the Cher département and in the Centre region of France. It was disbanded following the French canton reorganisation which came into effect in March 2015. It consisted of 11 communes, which joined the canton of Dun-sur-Auron in 2015. It had 5,508 inhabitants (2012).

Geography
An area of forestry and farming in the northeastern part of the arrondissement of Saint-Amand-Montrond centred on the town of Sancoins. The altitude varies from 173m at Neuvy-le-Barrois to 268m at Chaumont, with an average altitude of 209m.

The canton comprised 11 communes:

Augy-sur-Aubois
Chaumont
Givardon
Grossouvre
Mornay-sur-Allier
Neuilly-en-Dun
Neuvy-le-Barrois
Sagonne
Saint-Aignan-des-Noyers
Sancoins
Vereaux

Population

See also
 Arrondissements of the Cher department
 Cantons of the Cher department
 Communes of the Cher department

References

Sancoins
2015 disestablishments in France
States and territories disestablished in 2015